Rock Creek reservoir, also known as Scott King reservoir, is  north of the city of Ardmore, Carter County, Oklahoma in the United States. Created in 1979, it is operated by the city of Ardmore as a water supply recreational area.

References

Reservoirs in Oklahoma
Bodies of water of Carter County, Oklahoma